The Datong Theater is a former movie theater in Datong Borough, Taitung City, Taitung County, Taiwan.

History
The theater was opened in 1956 and became the entertainment center for the residents in the 1960s and 1970s. In the 1980s when televisions gained popularity among Taiwanese, many movie theaters closed down but Datong Theater remained in the business. However, fire destroyed the building on 17 August 2009 and subsequently the theater was closed. In 2018, the building was marked for demolition by Taitung County Government because of the danger it posed despite some opposition from local residents. Demolition works started on 2 December 2020.

See also
 Cinema of Taiwan

References

1956 establishments in Taiwan
2009 disestablishments in Taiwan
Buildings and structures in Taitung County
Burned buildings and structures
Theatres completed in 1956
Cinemas in Taiwan
Former cinemas